, formerly , was a Japanese female 7-dan professional Go player at Nihon Ki-in.

Achievements

Notable family members
Reiko Kobayashi has several professional players in her family.

 Father: Minoru Kitani, 9-dan professional go player
 Husband: Koichi Kobayashi, 9-dan professional go player, holder of three honorary titles
 Daughter: Izumi Kobayashi, former female title holder
 Son in law: Cho U, 9-dan professional player from Taiwan

Personal life

Reiko Kitani was trained by her father Minoru Kitani, and eventually married one of his best students, Koichi Kobayashi, who was 13 years younger. They had one daughter Izumi Kobayashi. Reiko Kobayashi died after an 18-month battle with cancer.

References

1939 births
1996 deaths
Japanese Go players
Female Go players